Danielle Gracia Williams (born 14 September 1992) is a Jamaican track and field athlete specialising in the sprint hurdles. She is best known for winning the gold medal at the 2015 World Championships. In addition, she won two medals at Summer Universiades, bronze in 2013 and gold in 2015, and represented her country at the 2013 World Championships.

Williams has personal bests of 12.32 seconds in the [100 metres hurdles] (2019) and 7.75 seconds in the 60 metres hurdles (2022).

Her older sister, Shermaine, is also a hurdler.

Competition record

Personal bests
Outdoor
100 metres – 11.24 (−0.7 m/s) (Pueblo 2013)
200 metres – 22.62 (−0.7 m/s) (Pueblo 2013)
100 metres hurdles – 12.32 (−0.3 m/s) (London 2019)
Indoor
60 metres – 7.29 (Clemson 2022)
200 metres – 23.12 (Clemson 2020)
60 metres hurdles – 7.75 (Clemson 2022)

References

External links

1992 births
Living people
People from Saint Andrew Parish, Jamaica
Jamaican female hurdlers
Athletes (track and field) at the 2014 Commonwealth Games
Athletes (track and field) at the 2018 Commonwealth Games
World Athletics Championships athletes for Jamaica
World Athletics Championships medalists
Universiade medalists in athletics (track and field)
Commonwealth Games medallists in athletics
Commonwealth Games silver medallists for Jamaica
Universiade gold medalists for Jamaica
Universiade bronze medalists for Jamaica
Diamond League winners
IAAF Continental Cup winners
Jamaican Athletics Championships winners
World Athletics Championships winners
Medalists at the 2013 Summer Universiade
Medalists at the 2015 Summer Universiade
Medallists at the 2018 Commonwealth Games